Lynch-Staunton is a surname. Notable people with the surname include:

Frank C. Lynch-Staunton, AOE (1905–1990), the 11th Lieutenant Governor of Alberta from 1979 to 1985
George Lynch-Staunton (1858–1940), lawyer and member of the Canadian Senate
Henry Lynch-Staunton (1873–1941), British sport shooter, who competed in the 1908 Summer Olympics
John Lynch-Staunton (1930–2012), Canadian senator and the first leader of the Conservative Party of Canada

See also
Victor Martyn Lynch-Staunton Award, monetary award given by the Canada Council for the Arts to mid-career Canadian artists

Compound surnames
English-language surnames